Yvon Picotte (born October 27, 1941 in Louiseville, Quebec) is a politician from Quebec, Canada.

He was a five-term Liberal Member of the National Assembly, who represented the electoral district of Maskinongé from 1973 to 1994.  He also was in charge of several portfolios in the second cabinet of Premier Robert Bourassa, including tourism and agriculture.

From 2002 to 2008, Picotte was a supporter of the Action démocratique du Québec.  From 2004 to 2006, he served as President of that party.  In May 2006, he made embarrassing comments about PQ Leader André Boisclair.  Boisclair had decided not to run in a by-election for the district of Sainte-Marie–Saint-Jacques (in Montreal), the district where he lives and that is well known for its large gay population.  Accusing Boisclair of being a coward, Picotte jokingly said that the riding would fit Boisclair, who is openly gay, like a glove (comme un gant).  Many journalists criticized Picotte, saying his comment sounded homophobic.  Within days, Picotte apologized.

In October 2008, he announced that he would vote for local Liberal candidate and friend Jean-Paul Diamond in the next provincial election.

Picotte currently is the Director of Pavillon du Nouveau Point de vue, an addiction intervention center.

Footnotes

External links
 

1941 births
Living people
People from Louiseville
Quebec Liberal Party MNAs
Action démocratique du Québec politicians
Canadian political party presidents